30Minutes Night Flight is Maaya Sakamoto's second mini-album. It was released in Japan on March 21, 2007 as a normal album version and a Limited Edition containing a DVD. The limited edition DVD came with a short film created by Production I.G. The album is also available is a collectibles box set, commemorating her tenth anniversary as a singer. The set, called "30Minutes Night Flight Hatsubai Kinen Special Box" contains a sheet of stamps (with Maaya Sakamoto designs), a scarf/towel, and a letter set. This special box does not, however, contain the album CD or the DVD.

Track listing

Charts

References

Maaya Sakamoto albums
2007 EPs
Victor Entertainment EPs
Japanese-language EPs